Shaoxing Keqiao Yuejia Football Club is a professional Chinese football club that participates in the China League Two division under licence from the Chinese Football Association (CFA). The team is based in Shaoxing, Zhejiang and their home stadium is the Shaoxing City Sports Centre Stadium that has a seating capacity of 20,000. Their majority shareholder is Cui Yi (崔毅) and the Yiteng Group.

They were founded as an amateur team in 1988 and called Dalian Tielu. They took part in China's national leagues before becoming a professional team when the Yiteng Group gained ownership of the club. After years of stagnation the club was moved to Harbin where they have since predominantly remained and gained their first silverware, which was the 2011 China League Two title. Since then, they gradually improved their league standing and gained promotion to China's top tier when they came second within the 2013 China League One division.

History
In April 1988 the club was established as Dalian Tielu and soon joined the Chinese national leagues at the bottom of the pyramid in the third tier at the beginning of the 1989 league season. After the team's debut performance the club's appearances within the national leagues became sporadic because they were an amateur team at a time when the league was being restructured as a fully professional unit. When professionalism arrived to the Chinese leagues in the 1994 league season, the club had started being funded by the Yiteng Group on February of that year. The funding helped to establish them as semi-professional unit and then soon after a fully professional team in the third division. Xu Yin and Cheng Xianfei were appointed as joint managers. They came third in the league and were promoted to the second tier.

The club's time in the second tier was not a success and at the end of the 1995 league season they finished tenth in the league and were relegated back into the third division. The Yiteng Group took full control of the club in 1996, and by the following season merged the team with local rivals Dalian Shunfa. With the merger the owners were hoping for promotion and by the 1999 league campaign they believed that they had assembled a squad capable of achieving this. They did not reach the division play-offs that season because Mianyang F.C. had exactly the same points and goal difference as them after the last-placed odd number team was taken out of the equation. The Chinese Football Association decided that the only way to settle the issue was that the two teams should draw lots to see who would qualify for the play-offs, with Mianyang winning in the end. The chairman Cui Yi and the Yiteng Group were so aggrieved that they decided to pull out of the competition the following season and sold their squad to Dalian Shide F.C. for 8 million Yuan.

After the Yiteng Group had formed significant business ties within Harbin, Heilongjiang, Cui Yi decided that it was a good time for the club to re-enter the national leagues on December 20, 2005. They registered with the Chinese FA the new name of the club called Harbin Yiteng and took part at the bottom of the Chinese pyramid in the third tier for the start of the 2006 Chinese league two division. The club moved in the 30,000 capacity Hagongda Stadium and they quickly won promotion at the end of the season after coming runners-up to Beijing BIT. The club struggled in the division and had a Chinese record sixteen game winless streak, however the team were able to avoid relegated that season. They moved to Yantai in Shandong in March 2008 and played in the 45,000 capacity Yantai Sports Park Stadium. They also replaced their red kit with a new all-blue outfit, however the changes did not work and they were relegated at the end of the 2008 league season. They briefly moved back to Dalian until April 1, 2011, when they returned to Harbin where their fortunes changed and they won their first championship, the 2011 China League Two division, and promotion back into the second division. Under Duan Xin reign as manager Harbin continued their good form in the second tier and at the end of the 2013 league season he would guide the club to second within the division and promotion to the top tier for the first time in their history.

At the start of the start of the 2014 Chinese Super League, former assistant Wang Helong was promoted to Head coach while Duan Xin remained as manager. The club started in the Chinese Super League with a nine-game losing streak. It ended on the 4 May 2014 when they beat local rivals Changchun Yatai 3–1 to claim their first top flight win, thanks to goals from Dori, Han Deming and Ricardo Steer. On 19 July 2014 Marijo Tot was brought in as the new head coach, however he was unable to reverse the club's fortunes and the team were relegated at the end of the season.

Yiteng F.C. moved to Shaoxing and changed their name as Zhejiang Yiteng F.C. in the 2016 season. In October 2018, when Yiteng back to Harbin and play with Heilongjiang F.C., they experienced a horrible treatment from fans. People called them "go back to Dalian""idiots", and game result end with 1:1. In January 2019, they relegated to the third-tier after failing to apply a League One license, despite finishing 12th in the last season.

Ownership and naming history

Current squad

First team

Reserve squad

Coaching staff

Managerial history
Information correct as of end of 2015 league season.

  Xu Yin 徐来贤 and  Cheng Xianfei 程显飞 1994–1999
  Li Hongwu 李洪武 March 2006 – May 2006
  Wang Jun 王军 May 2006 – March 2007
  Wang Hongli 王洪礼 March 2007 – April 2007
  Wang Jun 王军 April 2007
  Cho Yoon-hwan 赵允焕 April 2007 – June 2007
  Wang Jun 王军 June 2007 – Nov 2007
  Gai Zengjun 盖增君 Nov 2007 – June 2008
  Wang Jun 王军 June 2008 – June 2010
  Duan Xin 段鑫 13 June 2010 – March 2014
  Wang Helong 王贺龙 March 2014–19 July 2014
  Marijo Tot 马里奥·托特 19 July 2014 – 31 December 2014
  Duan Xin 段鑫 (caretaker) 31 December 2014 – 5 June 2015
  Gai Zengjun 盖增君 (caretaker) 5 June 2015 – 17 June 2015
  Duan Xin 段鑫 17 June 2015 – December 2015
  Goran Tomić 戈兰·托米奇 10 Jan 2016  – 22 Mar 2016
  Duan Xin 段鑫 (caretaker) 22 Mar 2016 –1 Dec 2016
  Maurício Copertino 毛里西奥·科佩尔蒂诺 1 Dec 2016 –28 May 2017
  Wang Jun 王军 (caretaker) 28 May 2017 –6 June 2017
  Marijo Tot 马里奥·托特 6 June 2017 –2 January 2018
  Maurício Copertino 毛里西奥·科佩尔蒂诺 2 January 2018 –24 September 2018
  Hu Zhaojun 胡兆军 (caretaker) 24 September 2018 – 3 March 2019
  Giles Stille 吉尔斯·斯蒂尔 3 March 2019–

Honours
 China League Two (Third Tier League)
Winners (1) : 2011

Results
As of the end of 2019 season.

All-time League Rankings

Yiteng didn't compete in 1990, 1992–1993 and 2000–2005. 
 in group stage.
 in Final round group stage.
 fail to apply League One license.

Key
 Pld = Played
 W = Games won
 D = Games drawn
 L = Games lost
 F = Goals for
 A = Goals against
 Pts = Points
 Pos = Final position

 DNQ = Did not qualify
 DNE = Did not enter
 NH = Not Held
 R1 = Round 1
 R2 = Round 2
 R3 = Round 3
 R4 = Round 4

 F = Final
 SF = Semi-finals
 QF = Quarter-finals
 R16 = Round of 16
 Group = Group stage
 GS2 = Second Group stage
 QR1 = First Qualifying Round
 QR2 = Second Qualifying Round
 QR3 = Third Qualifying Round

Notable players
Had international caps for their respective countries.

Asia
 Wang Jung-hyun

References

External links
Official Website

Football clubs in China
Association football clubs established in 1994
1994 establishments in China
Sport in Zhejiang